Gianni Puccini (9 November 1914 – 3 December 1968) was an Italian screenwriter and film director. He wrote for 32 films between 1940 and 1967. He also directed 18 films between 1951 and 1968.

Selected filmography
 Ossessione (1943)
 Tragic Hunt (1947)
 Bitter Rice (1949)
 Persiane chiuse (1950)
 The Captain of Venice (1951)
 Rome 11:00 (1952)
 Days of Love (1954)
 Sunset in Naples (1955)
 Supreme Confession (1956)
 My Wife's Enemy (1959 - directed)
 I cuori infranti (1963 - directed)
 The Seven Cervi Brothers (1968 - directed)

References

External links

1914 births
1968 deaths
Italian film directors
20th-century Italian screenwriters
Italian male screenwriters
20th-century Italian male writers
Film people from Milan